List of Windows phones may refer to:

2010 and earlier phone devices
 List of Windows Mobile devices (Windows Mobile 2003, Windows Mobile 2003 Second Edition (SE), Windows Mobile 5.0, 6.0, 6.1, 6.5)
2010-2015 phone devices
 List of Windows Phone 7 devices
 List of Windows Phone 8 devices
 List of Windows Phone 8.1 devices
2015-2017 phone devices
 List of Windows 10 Mobile devices

See also